The Bangladesh women's national cricket team toured South Africa in September 2013. They played South Africa in 3 One Day Internationals and 3 Twenty20 Internationals, losing both series 3–0.

Squads

Tour Match: South Africa Emerging Players v Bangladesh

WT20I Series

1st T20I

2nd T20I

3rd T20I

WODI Series

1st ODI

2nd ODI

3rd ODI

References

External links
Bangladesh Women tour of South Africa 2013/14 from Cricinfo

Bangladesh women's national cricket team tours
Women's international cricket tours of South Africa
International cricket competitions in 2013
2013 in women's cricket